Colonel Rabbi Aharon Gurevich is the first Chief Rabbi of the Russian Army since the 1917 Bolshevik Revolution. Rabbi Gurevich was appointed by Russian Chief Rabbi Berel Lazar, in December 2007.

References 

Chabad-Lubavitch Hasidim
Russian religious leaders
Chabad-Lubavitch rabbis
Chief rabbis of Russia
21st-century rabbis
Russian Hasidic rabbis
Hasidic rabbis in Europe
Living people
Rabbis in the military
Year of birth missing (living people)